The 2013 Copa del Sol took place in La Manga Club and Pinatar (Region of Murcia, Spain) between 23 January and 2 February 2013. The final was between Shakhtar Donetsk and Widzew Łódź with Ukrainian club winning.

The tournament gives an opening to the newly constructed Pinatar Arena Football Center. Like in the previous edition, 12 teams are divided into two groups, the Red Group and the Blue Group.

Group stage

Red Group

Blue Group

Final

Winners

Goalscorers 
3 goals (1 player)

 Wu Lei (Shanghai East Asia)

2 goals (5 players)

 Igor Vetokele (København)
 Henrikh Mkhitaryan (Shakhtar Donetsk)
 Chris Dickson (Shanghai East Asia)
 Zdeněk Ondrášek (Tromsø)
 Mariusz Stępiński (Widzew Łódź)

1 goal (38 players)

 Pavel Mamayev (CSKA Moscow)
 Sekou Oliseh (CSKA Moscow)
 Zoran Tošić (CSKA Moscow)
 Philip Haglund (Göteborg)
 Tobias Hysén (Göteborg)
 David Moberg Karlsson (Göteborg)
 Robin Söder (Göteborg)
 Mads Aaquist (København)
 Thomas Delaney (København)
 Rúrik Gíslason (København)
 César Santin (København)
 Daniel Chima (Molde)
 Magne Hoseth (Molde)
 Etzaz Hussain (Molde)
 Magne Simonsen (Molde)
 Nikola Nikezić (Olimpija)
 Damjan Trifković (Olimpija)
 Filip Valenčič (Olimpija)
 Luiz Adriano (Shakhtar Donetsk)
 Douglas Costa (Shakhtar Donetsk)
 Eduardo (Shakhtar Donetsk)
 Yaroslav Rakitskiy (Shakhtar Donetsk)
 Taison (Shakhtar Donetsk)
 Lü Wenjun (Shanghai East Asia)
 Zhu Zhengrong (Shanghai East Asia)
 Adama Diomande (Strømsgodset)
 Muhamed Keita (Strømsgodset)
 Gustav Wikheim (Strømsgodset)
 Remi Johansen (Tromsø)
 Aleksandar Prijović (Tromsø)
 Liviu Antal (Vaslui)
 Raul Costin (Vaslui)
 Nicolae Stanciu (Vaslui)
 Sebastian Dudek (Widzew Łódź)
 Marcin Kaczmarek (Widzew Łódź)
 Krystian Nowak (Widzew Łódź)
 Bartłomiej Pawłowski (Widzew Łódź)
 Mariusz Rybicki (Widzew Łódź)

References

External links 
 Copa del Sol: Official Page
 Kxweb.no: Match Reports
 Toppfotball.no: Results

2013
2012–13 in Ukrainian football
2012–13 in Slovenian football
2012–13 in Russian football
2012–13 in Polish football
2012–13 in Romanian football
2012–13 in Danish football
2013 in Norwegian football
2013 in Swedish football
2013 in Chinese football